The 1995 Portuguese Grand Prix (formally the XXIV Grande Prémio de Portugal) was a Formula One motor race held on 24 September 1995 at the Autódromo do Estoril, Estoril, Portugal. It was the thirteenth race of the 1995 Formula One season. The 71-lap race was the first Formula One win for David Coulthard of the Williams team after starting from pole position. Michael Schumacher was second in a Benetton, with Damon Hill third in the latter Williams car. After several controversial incidents previously involving Schumacher and Hill in the 1995 season, including collisions at Silverstone, Spa and Monza (the latter two of which saw confrontations between the two drivers respectively on the podium and at track-side), Schumacher and Hill shook hands with each other at the podium presentation following this race.

Report

Background 
To optimise their chances of winning at the Autódromo do Estoril, Williams brought an upgraded chassis to the race, a "B" specification of their FW17 car. The upgraded chassis would be used throughout the remainder of the season.

Practice and qualifying 
Two practice sessions were held before the race; the first was held on Friday morning and the second on Saturday morning. Both sessions lasted 1 hour and 45 minutes with weather conditions dry throughout. Häkkinen set the fastest time in the first session, posting a lap of 1:23.073, one-tenth of a second quicker than Hill and Schumacher, in second and third places respectively. Coulthard was fourth, with the Ferrari cars fifth and sixth fastest; Gerhard Berger ahead of Jean Alesi. Häkkinen was eleventh in the second practice session, two seconds slower than Hill, who was fastest with a time of 1:21.443. Coulthard was second in the Williams, eight-tenths of a second behind Hill. Schumacher was third, with Alesi fourth, both over a second behind Hill. Heinz-Harald Frentzen in a Sauber was fifth with Martin Brundle in the Ligier, Eddie Irvine in a Jordan and Berger rounding out the top eight positions.

Race
As the race began from its standing start, Ukyo Katayama who qualified in 16th moved into the racing path of Luca Badoer, whose Minardi began in 18th. The contact caused Katayama's Tyrrell to launch airborne and spin several times upside down along the start/finish straight. Katayama was extracted from the car and hospitalized for two days with what was later diagnosed with a strained neck and bruising in the crash.

Classification

Qualifying

Race 

Notes
 – Katayama started the original race but was involved in the first lap collision that resulted in a red flag. He did not take the restart but is listed as 'Retired' in the official results

Championship standings after the race
Bold text indicates who still has a theoretical chance of becoming World Champion.

Drivers' Championship standings

Constructors' Championship standings

Note: Only the top five positions are included for both sets of standings.

References 

Portuguese Grand Prix
Portuguese Grand Prix
Portuguese Grand Prix
Portuguese Grand Prix